The 2018–19 Denver Nuggets season was the 43rd season of the franchise in the National Basketball Association (NBA). The team revealed a new logo for the 2018–19 season. With a win against the Boston Celtics on March 18, the Nuggets clinched a playoff spot for the first time since the 2012–13 season.

In the playoffs, the Nuggets defeated the San Antonio Spurs in the First Round in seven games, winning their first playoff series since the Carmelo Anthony era in 2009. In the Semifinals, the Nuggets lost to the Portland Trail Blazers in seven games.

Draft

Roster

Standings

Division

Conference

Game log

Preseason 

|- style="background:#cfc"
| 1
| September 30
| @ LA Lakers
| 
| Juan Hernangómez (19)
| Mason Plumlee (8)
| Mason Plumlee (6)
| Valley View Casino Center13,565
| 1–0
|- style="background:#cfc"
| 2
| October 2
| @ LA Lakers
| 
| Mason Plumlee (23)
| Nikola Jokic (6)
| Trey Lyles (6)
| Staples Center18,997
| 2–0
|- style="background:#cfc"
| 3
| October 5
| Perth Wildcats
| 
| Monte Morris (15)
| Paul Millsap (9)
| Monte Morris (9)
| Pepsi Center9,812
| 3–0
|- style="background:#fcc"
| 4
| October 9
| @ LA Clippers
| 
| Trey Lyles (15)
| Juan Hernangómez (12)
| Monte Morris (6)
| Staples Center10,187
| 3–1
|- style="background:#cfc"
| 5
| October 12
| @ Chicago
| 
| Gary Harris (18)
| Mason Plumlee (9)
| Will Barton (7)
| United Center18,973
| 4–1

Regular season 

|- style="background:#cfc"
| 1
| October 17
| @ L.A. Clippers
| 
| Nikola Jokić (21)
| Paul Millsap (16)
| Nikola Jokić (5)
| Staples Center19,068
| 1–0
|- style="background:#cfc"
| 2
| October 20
| Phoenix
| 
| Nikola Jokić (35)
| Nikola Jokić (12)
| Nikola Jokić (11)
| Pepsi Center19,592
| 2–0
|- style="background:#cfc"
| 3
| October 21
| Golden State
| 
| Gary Harris (28)
| Nikola Jokić (11)
| Nikola Jokić (6)
| Pepsi Center19,520
| 3–0
|- style="background:#cfc"
| 4
| October 23
| Sacramento
| 
| Jamal Murray (19)
| Nikola Jokić (12)
| Monté Morris (7)
| Pepsi Center13,214
| 4–0
|- style="background:#fcc"
| 5
| October 25
| @ L.A. Lakers
| 
| Nikola Jokić (24)
| Nikola Jokić (11)
| Monté Morris (7)
| Staples Center18,997
| 4–1
|- style="background:#cfc"
| 6
| October 29
| New Orleans
| 
| Harris & Murray (23)
| Nikola Jokić (9)
| Nikola Jokić (10)
| Pepsi Center15,217
| 5–1
|- style="background:#cfc"
| 7
| October 31
| @ Chicago
| 
| Nikola Jokić (22)
| Nikola Jokić (12)
| Nikola Jokić (9)
| United Center19,027
| 6–1

|- style="background:#cfc"
| 8
| November 1
| @ Cleveland
| 
| Juan Hernangómez (23)
| Trey Lyles (8)
| Malik Beasley (4)
| Quicken Loans Arena19,432
| 7–1
|- style="background:#cfc"
| 9
| November 3
| Utah
| 
| Gary Harris (20)
| Nikola Jokić (10)
| Nikola Jokić (16)
| Pepsi Center19,520
| 8–1
|- style="background:#cfc"
| 10
| November 5
| Boston
| 
| Jamal Murray (48)
| Nikola Jokić (10)
| Nikola Jokić (8)
| Pepsi Center19,520
| 9–1
|- style="background:#fcc"
| 11
| November 7
| @ Memphis
| 
| Gary Harris (20)
| Trey Lyles (9)
| Jamal Murray (7)
| FedExForum15,832
| 9–2
|- style="background:#fcc"
| 12
| November 9
| Brooklyn
| 
| Nikola Jokić (37)
| Nikola Jokić (21)
| Jamal Murray (7)
| Pepsi Center19,520
| 9–3
|- style="background:#fcc"
| 13
| November 11
| Milwaukee
| 
| Paul Millsap (25)
| Millsap, Jokić (8)
| Monté Morris (10)
| Pepsi Center19,520
| 9–4
|- style="background:#fcc"
| 14
| November 13
| Houston
| 
| Monté Morris (19)
| Nikola Jokić (12)
| Nikola Jokić (7)
| Pepsi Center16,741
| 9–5
|- style="background:#cfc"
| 15
| November 15
| Atlanta
| 
| Juan Hernangómez (25)
| Hernangómez, Millsap, Jokić (9)
| Nikola Jokić (7)
| Pepsi Center15,103
| 10–5
|- style="background:#fcc"
| 16
| November 17
| @ New Orleans
| 
| Nikola Jokić (25)
| Juan Hernangómez (11)
| Nikola Jokić (8)
| Smoothie King Center15,408
| 10–6
|- style="background:#fcc"
| 17
| November 19
| @ Milwaukee
| 
| Nikola Jokić (20)
| Paul Millsap (9)
| Jamal Murray (9)
| Fiserv Forum17,341
| 10–7
|- style="background:#cfc"
| 18
| November 21
| @ Minnesota
| 
| Paul Millsap (25)
| Nikola Jokić (12)
| Nikola Jokić (10)
| Target Center15,086
| 11–7
|- style="background:#cfc"
| 19
| November 23
| Orlando
| 
| Trey Lyles (22)
| Mason Plumlee (11)
| Nikola Jokić (10)
| Pepsi Center19,520
| 12–7
|- style="background:#cfc"
| 20
| November 24
| @ Oklahoma City
| 
| Jamal Murray (22)
| Torrey Craig (10)
| Jamal Murray (8)
| Chesapeake Energy Arena18,203
| 13–7
|- style="background:#cfc"
| 21
| November 27
| L.A. Lakers
| 
| Millsap, Beasley, Murray (20)
| Paul Millsap (11)
| Jokić & Morris (7)
| Pepsi Center19,583
| 14–7
|- style="background:#cfc"
| 22
| November 30
| @ Portland
| 
| Gary Harris (27)
| Juan Hernangómez (11)
| Nikola Jokić (8)
| Moda Center19,459
| 15–7

|- style="background:#cfc"
| 23
| December 3
| @ Toronto
| 
| Nikola Jokić (23)
| Nikola Jokić (11)
| Nikola Jokić (15)
| Air Canada Centre19,800
| 16–7
|- style="background:#cfc"
| 24
| December 5
| @ Orlando
| 
| Jamal Murray (31)
| Jokić & Millsap (8)
| Nikola Jokić (13)
| Amway Center16,636
| 17–7
|- style="background:#fcc"
| 25
| December 7
| @ Charlotte
| 
| Jamal Murray (20)
| Nikola Jokić (11)
| Jamal Murray (7)
| Spectrum Center13,755
| 17–8
|- style="background:#fcc"
| 26
| December 8
| @ Atlanta
| 
| Nikola Jokić (24)
| Nikola Jokić (11)
| Jokić & Morris (7)
| Philips Arena14,409
| 17–9
|- style="background:#cfc"
| 27
| December 10
| Memphis
| 
| Nikola Jokić (27)
| Nikola Jokić (12)
| Nikola Jokić (6)
| Pepsi Center15,278
| 18–9
|- style="background:#cfc"
| 28
| December 14
| Oklahoma City
| 
| Nikola Jokić (24)
| Nikola Jokić (15)
| Nikola Jokić (9)
| Pepsi Center19,520
| 19–9
|- style="background:#cfc"
| 29
| December 16
| Toronto
| 
| Nikola Jokić (26)
| Nikola Jokić (9)
| Jokić, Morris, Murray (4)
| Pepsi Center19,520
| 20–9
|- style="background:#cfc"
| 30
| December 18
| Dallas
| 
| Nikola Jokić (32)
| Nikola Jokić (16)
| Jamal Murray (15)
| Pepsi Center15,764
| 21–9
|- style="background:#fcc"
| 31
| December 22
| @ L.A. Clippers
| 
| Nikola Jokić (19)
| Mason Plumlee (9)
| Monté Morris (5)
| Staples Center16,571
| 21–10
|- style="background:#fcc"
| 32
| December 26
| @ San Antonio
| 
| Juan Hernangómez (27)
| Juan Hernangómez (13)
| Nikola Jokić (10)
| AT&T Center18,408
| 21–11
|- style="background:#cfc"
| 33
| December 28
| San Antonio
| 
| Jamal Murray (31)
| Mason Plumlee (13)
| Nikola Jokić (9)
| Pepsi Center20,076
| 22–11
|- style="background:#cfc"
| 34
| December 29
| @ Phoenix
| 
| Jamal Murray (46)
| Juan Hernangómez (9)
| Nikola Jokić (9)
| Talking Stick Resort Arena14,975
| 23–11

|- style="background:#cfc"
| 35
| January 1
| New York
| 
| Malik Beasley (23)
| Nikola Jokić (14)
| Nikola Jokić (15)
| Pepsi Center19,520
| 24–11
|- style="background:#cfc"
| 36
| January 3
| @ Sacramento
| 
| Jamal Murray (36)
| Nikola Jokić (13)
| Jokić, Murray (6)
| Golden 1 Center17,583
| 25–11
|- style="background:#cfc"
| 37
| January 5
| Charlotte
| 
| Nikola Jokić (39)
| Nikola Jokić (12)
| Jamal Murray (7)
| Pepsi Center19,861
| 26–11
|- style="background:#fcc"
| 38 
| January 7
| @ Houston
| 
| Nikola Jokić (24)
| Nikola Jokić (13)
| Monté Morris (5)
| Toyota Center18,055
| 26–12
|- style="background:#cfc"
| 39
| January 8
| @ Miami
| 
| Nikola Jokić (29)
| Torrey Craig (16)
| Nikola Jokić (10)
| American Airlines Arena19,600
| 27–12
|- style="background:#cfc"
| 40
| January 10
| L.A. Clippers
| 
| Jamal Murray (23)
| Nikola Jokić (14)
| Nikola Jokić (10)
| Pepsi Center15,742
| 28–12
|- style="background:#fcc"
| 41
| January 12
| @ Phoenix
| 
| Nikola Jokić (23)
| Paul Millsap (11)
| Murray, Morris (5)
| Talking Stick Resort Arena15,246
| 28–13
|- style="background:#cfc"
| 42
| January 13
| Portland
| 
| Nikola Jokić (40)
| Nikola Jokić (10)
| Nikola Jokić (8)
| Pepsi Center19,520
| 29–13
|- style="background:#fcc"
| 43
| January 15
| Golden State
| 
| Malik Beasley (22)
| Will Barton (8)
| Nikola Jokić (8)
| Pepsi Center19,896
| 29–14
|- style="background:#cfc"
| 44
| January 17
| Chicago
| 
| Jamal Murray (25)
| Nikola Jokić (8)
| Nikola Jokić (11)
| Pepsi Center17,289
| 30–14
|- style="background:#cfc"
| 45
| January 19
| Cleveland
| 
| Jamal Murray (26)
| Nikola Jokić (11)
| Nikola Jokić (12)
| Pepsi Center19,520
| 31–14
|- style="background:#fcc"
| 46
| January 23
| @ Utah
| 
| Nikola Jokić (28)
| Nikola Jokić (21)
| Nikola Jokić (6)
| Vivint Smart Home Arena18,306
| 31–15
|- style="background:#cfc"
| 47
| January 25
| Phoenix
| 
| Paul Millsap (20)
| Paul Millsap (9)
| Mason Plumlee (6)
| Pepsi Center17,425
| 32–15
|- style="background:#cfc"
| 48
| January 26
| Philadelphia
| 
| Nikola Jokić (32)
| Nikola Jokić (18)
| Nikola Jokić (10)
| Pepsi Center19,673
| 33–15
|- style="background:#cfc"
| 49
| January 28
| @ Memphis
| 
| Nikola Jokić (24)
| Mason Plumlee (7)
| Harris, Jokić, Beasley (3)
| FedExForum12,917
| 34–15
|- style="background:#cfc"
| 50
| January 30
| @ New Orleans
| 
| Malik Beasley (22)
| Nikola Jokić (13)
| Nikola Jokić (10)
| Smoothie King Center14,211
| 35–15

|- style="background:#cfc"
| 51
| February 1
| Houston
| 
| Malik Beasley (35)
| Nikola Jokić (13)
| Nikola Jokić (9)
| Pepsi Center20,106
| 36–15
|- style="background:#cfc"
| 52
| February 2
| @ Minnesota
| 
| Malik Beasley (22)
| Nikola Jokić (16)
| Jokić, Morris (10)
| Target Center17,208
| 37–15
|- style="background:#fcc"
| 53 
| February 4
| @ Detroit
| 
| Trey Lyles (20)
| Mason Plumlee (11)
| Will Barton (7)
| Little Caesars Arena12,589
| 37–16
|- style="background:#fcc"
| 54
| February 6
| @ Brooklyn
| 
| Nikola Jokić (25)
| Nikola Jokić (14)
| Jamal Murray (11)
| Barclays Center14,516
| 37–17
|- style="background:#fcc"
| 55
| February 8
| @ Philadelphia
| 
| Nikola Jokić (27)
| Nikola Jokić (10)
| Nikola Jokić (10)
| Wells Fargo Center20,627
| 37–18
|- style="background:#cfc"
| 56
| February 11
| Miami
| 
| Nikola Jokić (23)
| Nikola Jokić (12)
| Monté Morris (7)
| Pepsi Center18,378
| 38–18
|- style="background:#cfc"
| 57
| February 13
| Sacramento
| 
| Paul Millsap (25)
| Nikola Jokić (18)
| Nikola Jokić (11)
| Pepsi Center17,938
| 39–18
|- align="center"
|colspan="9" bgcolor="#bbcaff"|All-Star Break
|- style="background:#cfc"
| 58
| February 22
| @ Dallas
| 
| Nikola Jokić (19)
| Jokić & Millsap (13)
| Nikola Jokić (8)
| American Airlines Center20,382
| 40–18
|- style="background:#cfc"
| 59
| February 24
| L.A. Clippers
| 
| Nikola Jokić (22)
| Jokić & Millsap (16)
| Jamal Murray (6)
| Pepsi Center19,956
| 41–18
|- style="background:#cfc"
| 60
| February 26
| Oklahoma City
| 
| Nikola Jokić (36)
| Paul Millsap (10)
| Nikola Jokić (10)
| Pepsi Center18,378
| 42–18
|- style="background:#fcc"
| 61
| February 28
| Utah
| 
| Murray & Barton (21)
| Jokić & Barton (13)
| Nikola Jokić (7)
| Pepsi Center19,520
| 42–19

|- style="background:#fcc"
| 62
| March 2
| New Orleans
| 
| Murray & Jokić (20)
| Nikola Jokić (9)
| Nikola Jokić (7)
| Pepsi Center19,155
| 42–20
|- style="background:#fcc"
| 63
| March 4
| @ San Antonio
| 
| Jamal Murray (25)
| Paul Millsap (11)
| Jamal Murray (8)
| AT&T Center18,354
| 42–21
|- style="background:#cfc"
| 64
| March 6
| @ L.A. Lakers
| 
| Will Barton (23)
| Nikola Jokić (17)
| Nikola Jokić (8)
| Staples Center18,997
| 43–21
|- style="background:#fcc"
| 65
| March 8
| @ Golden State
| 
| Morris & Beasley (17)
| Mason Plumlee (12)
| Monté Morris (6)
| Oracle Arena19,596
| 43–22
|- style="background:#cfc"
| 66
| March 12
| Minnesota
| 
| Jamal Murray (30)
| Nikola Jokić (8)
| Mason Plumlee (8)
| Pepsi Center16,874
| 44–22
|- style="background:#cfc"
| 67
| March 14
| Dallas
| 
| Paul Millsap (33)
| Nikola Jokić (14)
| Nikola Jokić (8)
| Pepsi Center19,520
| 45–22
|- style="background:#cfc"
| 68
| March 16
| Indiana
| 
| Nikola Jokić (26)
| Paul Millsap (13)
| Jokić & Barton & Plumlee (5)
| Pepsi Center19,856
| 46–22
|- style="background:#cfc"
| 69
| March 18
| @ Boston
| 
| Nikola Jokić (21)
| Nikola Jokić (13)
| Nikola Jokić (7)
| TD Garden18,624
| 47–22
|- style="background:#cfc"
| 70
| March 21
| @ Washington
| 
| five players (15)
| Mason Plumlee (11)
| Nikola Jokić (11)
| Capital One Arena15,986
| 48–22
|- style="background:#cfc"
| 71
| March 22
| @ New York
| 
| Nikola Jokić (21)
| Nikola Jokić (17)
| Murray & Jokić (5)
| Madison Square Garden19,290
| 49–22
|- style="background:#fcc"
| 72
| March 24
| @ Indiana
| 
| Nikola Jokić (19)
| Nikola Jokić (11)
| Nikola Jokić (8)
| Bankers Life Fieldhouse17,923
| 49–23
|- style="background:#cfc"
| 73
| March 26
| Detroit
| 
| Jamal Murray (33)
| Nikola Jokić (15)
| Murray, Millsap (5)
| Pepsi Center19,520
| 50–23
|- style="background:#fcc"
| 74
| March 28
| @ Houston
| 
| Jamal Murray (20)
| Nikola Jokić (8)
| Nikola Jokić (6)
| Toyota Center18,055
| 50–24
|- style="background:#cfc"
| 75
| March 29
| @ Oklahoma City
| 
| Jamal Murray (27)
| Nikola Jokić (16)
| Jamal Murray (9)
| Chesapeake Energy Arena18,203
| 51–24
|- style="background:#fcc"
| 76
| March 31
| Washington
| 
| Nikola Jokić (23)
| Paul Millsap (13)
| Jokić & Barton (4)
| Pepsi Center17,356
| 51–25

|- style="background:#fcc"
| 77
| April 2
| @ Golden State
| 
| Jamal Murray (17)
| Paul Millsap (8)
| Nikola Jokić (5)
| Oracle Arena19,596
| 51–26
|- style="background:#cfc"
| 78
| April 3
| San Antonio
| 
| Nikola Jokic (20)
| Nikola Jokic (11)
| Jamal Murray (11)
| Pepsi Center17,643
| 52–26
|- style="background:#cfc"
| 79
| April 5
| Portland
| 
| Paul Millsap (25)
| Nikola Jokic (13)
| Nikola Jokic (9)
| Pepsi Center19,928
| 53–26
|- style="background:#fcc"
| 80 
| April 7
| @ Portland
|  
| Gary Harris (18)
| Mason Plumlee (11)
| Mason Plumlee (6)
| Moda Center19,890
| 53–27
|- style="background:#fcc"
| 81
| April 9
| @ Utah
|  
| Malik Beasley (25)
| Mason Plumlee (8)
| Mason Plumlee (6)
| Vivint Smart Home Arena18,306
| 53–28
|- style="background:#cfc"
| 82
| April 10
| Minnesota
|  
| Nikola Jokic (29)
| Nikola Jokic (14)
| Jamal Murray (7)
| Pepsi Center16,332
| 54–28

Playoffs

Game log

|- bgcolor=ffcccc
| 1
| April 13
| San Antonio 
| 
| Gary Harris (20)
| Nikola Jokić (14)
| Nikola Jokić (14)
| Pepsi Center19,520
| 0–1
|- bgcolor=ccffcc
| 2
| April 16
| San Antonio
| 
| Jamal Murray (24)
| Nikola Jokić (13)
| Nikola Jokić (8)
| Pepsi Center19,520
| 1–1
|- bgcolor=ffcccc
| 3
| April 18
| @ San Antonio
| 
| Nikola Jokić (22)
| Malik Beasley (9)
| Harris, Jokić, Morris (7)
| AT&T Center18,354
| 1–2
|- bgcolor=ccffcc
| 4
| April 20
| @ San Antonio
| 
| Nikola Jokić (29)
| Nikola Jokić (12)
| Nikola Jokić (8)
| AT&T Center18,354
| 2–2
|- bgcolor=ccffcc
| 5
| April 23
| San Antonio
| 
| Jamal Murray (24)
| Nikola Jokić (13)
| Nikola Jokić (8)
| Pepsi Center19,520
| 3–2
|- bgcolor=ffcccc
| 6
| April 25
| @ San Antonio
| 
| Nikola Jokić (43)
| Nikola Jokić (12)
| Nikola Jokić (9)
| AT&T Center18,354
| 3–3
|- bgcolor=ccffcc
| 7
| April 27
| San Antonio
| 
| Jamal Murray (23)
| Nikola Jokić (15)
| Nikola Jokić (10)
| Pepsi Center19,725
| 4–3

|- bgcolor=ccffcc
| 1
| April 29
| Portland
| 
| Nikola Jokić (37)
| Nikola Jokić (9)
| Jamal Murray (8)
| Pepsi Center19,520
| 1–0
|- bgcolor=ffcccc
| 2
| May 1
| Portland
| 
| Nikola Jokić (16)
| Nikola Jokić (14)
| Nikola Jokić (7)
| Pepsi Center19,520
| 1–1
|- bgcolor=ffcccc
| 3
| May 3
| @ Portland
| 
| Jamal Murray (34)
| Nikola Jokić (18)
| Nikola Jokić (14)
| Moda Center20,193
| 1–2
|- bgcolor=ccffcc
| 4
| May 5
| @ Portland
| 
| Jamal Murray (34)
| Nikola Jokić (12)
| Nikola Jokić (11)
| Moda Center20,146
| 2–2
|- bgcolor=ccffcc
| 5
| May 7
| Portland
| 
| Nikola Jokić (25)
| Nikola Jokić (19)
| Jamal Murray (9)
| Pepsi Center19,520
| 3–2
|- bgcolor=ffcccc
| 6
| May 9
| @ Portland
| 
| Nikola Jokić (29)
| Nikola Jokić (12)
| Nikola Jokić (8)
| Moda Center20,022
| 3–3
|- bgcolor=ffcccc
| 7
| May 12
| Portland
|
| Nikola Jokić (29)
| Nikola Jokić (13)
| Jamal Murray (5)
| Pepsi Center19,520
| 3–4

Player statistics

Regular season

|- align="center" bgcolor=""
| 
| 7 || 0 || 3.1 || .300 || .000 || .500 || .6 || .9 || .3 || .0 || 1.0
|- align="center" bgcolor=""
| 
| 43 || 38 || 27.7 || .402 || .342 || .770 || 4.6 || 2.9 || .4 || .5 || 11.5
|- align="center" bgcolor=""
| 
| 81 || 18 || 23.2 || .474 || .402 || style=|.848 || 2.5 || 1.2 || .7 || .1 || 11.3
|- align="center" bgcolor=""
| 
| 75 || 37 || 20.0 || .442 || .324 || .700 || 3.5 || 1.0 || .5 || .6 || 5.7
|- align="center" bgcolor=""
| 
| 16 || 0 || 3.6 || .261 || .333 || .818 || .2 || .9 || .0 || .0 || 1.4
|- align="center" bgcolor=""
| 
| 57 || 48 || 28.8 || .424 || .339 || .799 || 2.8 || 2.2 || 1.0 || .3 || 12.9
|- align="center" bgcolor=""
| 
| 70 || 25 || 19.4 || .439 || .365 || .767 || 3.8 || .8 || .4 || .3 || 5.8
|- align="center" bgcolor=""
| 
| 80 || style=|80 || 31.3 || .511 || .307 || .821 || style=|10.8 || style=|7.3 || style=|1.4 || .7 || style=|20.1
|- align="center" bgcolor=""
| 
| 25 || 0 || 3.8 || .500 || .400 || .333 || .7 || .2 || .1 || .0 || .9
|- align="center" bgcolor=""
| 
| 64 || 2 || 17.5 || .418 || .255 || .698 || 3.8 || 1.4 || .5 || .4 || 8.5
|- align="center" bgcolor=""
| 
| 70 || 65 || 27.1 || .484 || .365 || .727 || 7.2 || 2.0 || 1.2 || .8 || 12.6
|- align="center" bgcolor=""
| 
| style=|82 || 6 || 24.0 || .493 || .414 || .802 || 2.4 || 3.6 || .9 || .0 || 10.4
|- align="center" bgcolor=""
| 
| 75 || 74 || style=|32.6 || .437 || .367 || style=|.848 || 4.2 || 4.8 || .9 || .4 || 18.2
|- align="center" bgcolor=""
| 
| style=|82 || 17 || 21.1 || style=|.593 || .200 || .561 || 6.4 || 3.0 || .8 || style=|.9 || 7.8
|- align="center" bgcolor=""
| 
| 12 || 0 || 15.1 || .343 || .279 || .630 || 1.1 || 1.9 || .4 || .1 || 8.1
|- align="center" bgcolor=""
| 
| 17 || 0 || 4.1 || .474 || .000 || .600 || 1.4 || .2 || .4 || .1 || 1.4
|- align="center" bgcolor=""
| 
| 11 || 0 || 3.3 || .538 || style=|.429 || .500 || .4 || .5 || .0 || .0 || 1.6
|- align="center" bgcolor=""
| 
| 4 || 0 || 9.3 || .333 || .375 || .000 || .3 || .5 || .0 || .3 || 2.3
|}

Playoffs

|- align="center" bgcolor=""
| 
| 14 || 3 || 23.4 || .348 || .273 || .692 || 4.8 || 1.7 || .3 || .6 || 9.1
|- align="center" bgcolor=""
| 
| 14 || 0 || 20.1 || .387 || .404 || .710 || 3.4 || 1.0 || .2 || .1 || 8.1
|- align="center" bgcolor=""
| 
| 14 || 11 || 23.6 || .478 || .472 || .563 || 5.1 || .9 || .5 || .4 || 6.6
|- align="center" bgcolor=""
| 
| 14 || 14 || 37.0 || .462 || .351 || .868 || 4.1 || 2.3 || .9 || .6 || 14.2
|- align="center" bgcolor=""
| 
| 5 || 0 || 2.9 || .333 || .500 || .000 || .6 || .0 || .0 || .0 || .6
|- align="center" bgcolor=""
| 
| 14 || 14 || 39.7 || .506 || .393 || .846 || 13.0 || 8.4 || 1.1 || .9 || 25.1
|- align="center" bgcolor=""
| 
| 3 || 0 || 2.7 || .000 || .000 || .000 || .3 || .7 || .0 || .0 || .0
|- align="center" bgcolor=""
| 
| 14 || 14 || 33.5 || .468 || .316 || .770 || 6.7 || .8 || .9 || 1.1 || 14.6
|- align="center" bgcolor=""
| 
| 14 || 0 || 16.0 || .384 || .000 || .692 || 1.4 || 2.6 || .4 || .1 || 5.4
|- align="center" bgcolor=""
| 
| 14 || 14 || 36.3 || .425 || .337 || .903 || 4.4 || 4.7 || 1.0 || .1 || 21.3
|- align="center" bgcolor=""
| 
| 14 || 0 || 15.6 || .511 || .000 || .571 || 4.4 || 1.5 || .5 || .7 || 4.6
|- align="center" bgcolor=""
| 
| 3 || 0 || 1.6 || .000 || .000 || .000 || .3 || .0 || .0 || .3 || .0
|}

Transactions

Trades

Contracts

Re-signed

Additions

Subtractions

References

2018–19
Denver Nuggets
Denver Nuggets
Denver Nuggets